Emiliano Zapata Municipality is a municipality in Tabasco in south-eastern Mexico.

References

Municipalities of Tabasco

es:Emiliano Zapata (Tabasco)